"Skin Up Pin Up" and "Flourella" are two songs by the English alternative rock band Mansun. The songs were written and produced by band-leader Paul Draper. "Skin Up Pin Up" was recorded in London during the group's first recording session and "Flourella" during the group's second recording session in Ewloe, North Wales. The single was released as a double a-side on white 7" vinyl and CD and charted at #91 on the UK Singles Chart.

Both songs were later reworked and re-released in 1997. "Flourella" was rerecorded and remixed for inclusion on the group's debut album, though was dropped and instead appeared on the "She Makes My Nose Bleed" single. "Skin Up Pin Up" was remixed by the British electronic music group 808 State and released on the hugely successful superhero action film soundtrack Spawn: The Album on July 29, 1997.

Track listing

Personnel
Mansun
 Paul Draper – vocals, electric guitar, bass, keyboards, programming
 Dominic Chad – backing vocals, electric guitar
 Stove - bass

Production
 Paul Draper – producer
 Ronnie Stone – engineer
 Mike Hunter – engineer ("Flourella")
 Ian Caple – engineer ("Flourella")

Chart positions

References

1995 singles
1995 songs
Mansun songs
Songs written by Paul Draper (musician)